Arasawa No.3 Dam  is an earthfill dam located in Iwate Prefecture in Japan. The dam is used for flood control. The catchment area of the dam is 12 km2. The dam impounds about 19  ha of land when full and can store 1194 thousand cubic meters of water. The construction of the dam was completed in 1960.

See also
List of dams in Japan

References

Dams in Iwate Prefecture